Deh-e Hasan Ali (also Romanized as Deh-e Ḩasan ‘Alī and Deh-e Ḩasan‘alī) is a village in Keshit Rural District, Golbaf District, Kerman County, Kerman Province, Iran. At the 2006 census, its population was 8, in 4 families.

References 

Populated places in Kerman County